Methyldichlorophosphine (alternatively known as dichloro(methyl)phosphane and methyl phosphonous dichloride) is an organophosphorus compound with the chemical formula CH3PCl2. It is a colorless, corrosive, flammable, and highly reactive liquid with a pungent odor.

Preparation
Methyldichlorophosphine is produced by alkylation of phosphorus trichloride with methyl iodide followed by reduction of the resulting phosphonium salt with iron powder:  The compound is an intermediate for the synthesis of other chemicals for instance dimethylphenylphosphine:
CH3I  +  PCl3  +  AlCl3  → [CH3PCl3]+AlCl3I−
[CH3PCl3]+AlCl3I−  +  Fe  →   CH3PCl2  +  FeClI +  AlCl3

Uses
Methyldichlorophosphine belongs to the group of halophosphines, some of which are used as intermediates in the production of plant protection agents, stabilizers for plastics, and catalysts. It is a precursor of the herbicide Glufosinate. It is also used in the production of flameproofing compounds.

Due to the recycling problem of phosphoryl chloride, SW was adopted in step three of the DMHP process in the preparation of GB. SW was also adopted as a standard precursor to V agents, having been used to prepare QL for unitary and binary VX. SW was the first agent adopted to prepare VX in one pot reaction by aqueous medium.

Safety
It is also toxic if inhaled, can cause burns upon contact with the skin and eyes, and releases fumes of hydrochloric acid in moist environments.

References

Herbicides
Nerve agent precursors
Phosphines